Chang San-cheng or Simon Chang (born 24 June 1954) is a Taiwanese politician who has been the Mayor of Taoyuan City since 25 December 2022. He was Premier of the Republic of China from 1 February 2016 until 20 May 2016, appointed by President Ma Ying-jeou. Before assuming the Premiership, he had served as Vice Premier from 8 December 2014. Chang was the first nonpartisan Premier of the Republic of China.

Chang began an independent campaign for the 2020 Taiwanese presidential election, then suspended his run to join the Kuomintang ticket, headed by Han Kuo-yu. The pair lost to incumbent president Tsai Ing-wen and her running mate William Lai.

Education
Chang earned his bachelor's degree in civil engineering from National Taiwan University in 1976. In 1977, he finished his master's degree in civil and environmental engineering at Stanford University. In 1981, He received a doctoral degree in civil and environmental engineering from Cornell University.

Early career
Upon graduation, Chang returned to Taiwan to serve as a lecturer, associate professor and finally, professor in the Department of Civil Engineering of National Taiwan University from 1981 to 1990. He was the Director for National Center for High-Performance Computing from 1991 to 1997. From 1998 to 2000, he was the Director of the Department of Planning and Evaluation of National Science Council. Between 2000 and 2010, he worked for Acer Inc. as Vice President of the e-Enabling Service Business Group, and between 2010 and 2012, he worked for Google as the Director of Google's hardware operations in Asia.

Political career
Chang was appointed as a Minister without Portfolio of the Executive Yuan in 2012. On March 3, 2014, the National Science Council was upgraded to  the Ministry of Science and Technology and Chang served as its first minister. On December 8, 2014, after the ruling Kuomintang lost the local elections, Chang became the Vice Premier after a cabinet reshuffle. On January 16, 2016, after the KMT lost the presidency and its majority in the Legislative Yuan, President Ma appointed Chang as the Premier to serve the remaining four months during the period of transition of power. As a result, Chang became the first nonpartisan Premier of the Republic of China.

2020 presidential campaign
Chang announced his independent candidacy for the 2020 Taiwan presidential election on 17 February 2019. Chang later joined the presidential campaign of Kuomintang candidate Han Kuo-yu as an adviser without halting his own campaign. In August 2019, Han formed a national policy advisory group headed by Chang. Chang's selection as the Kuomintang's 2020 Taiwan presidential election vice presidential candidate was announced on 11 November 2019.

|-
! style="background-color:#E9E9E9;text-align:center;" rowspan= 2 colspan=2 | Party
! style="background-color:#E9E9E9;text-align:center;" colspan=2 | Candidate
! style="background-color:#E9E9E9;text-align:center;" rowspan= 2 | Votes
! style="background-color:#E9E9E9;text-align:center;" rowspan= 2 colspan=2| Percentage
|- style="background-color:#E9E9E9;"
| style="text-align:center;" |President
| style="text-align:center;" |Vice president
|-
| style="background-color:"|
| style="text-align:left;" | Democratic Progressive Party
| style="text-align:left;" | Tsai Ing-wen
| style="text-align:left;" | William Lai
| style="text-align:right;" | 8,170,231
| style="text-align:right;" | 57.13%
| style="text-align:right;" | 
|-
| style="background-color:"|
| style="text-align:left;" |  Kuomintang
| style="text-align:left;" | Han Kuo-yu
| style="text-align:left;" | Chang San-cheng
| style="text-align:right;" | 5,522,119
| style="text-align:right;" | 38.61%
| style="text-align:right;" | 
|-
| style="background-color:"|
| style="text-align:left;" |  People First Party
| style="text-align:left;" | James Soong
| style="text-align:left;" | Sandra Yu
| style="text-align:right;" | 608,590
| style="text-align:right;" |  4.26%
| style="text-align:right;" | 
|-
! colspan="4" style="text-align:right;" |Total
! style="text-align:right;" |14,300,940	
! style="text-align:right;" colspan=2|100%
|-
|colspan="4" style="text-align:right;" |Valid votes
| style="text-align:right;" |14,300,940	
| style="text-align:right;" colspan=2|98.87%
|-
|colspan="4" style="text-align:right;" |Invalid votes
| style="text-align:right;" |163,631
| style="text-align:right;" colspan=2|1.13%
|-
|colspan="4" style="text-align:right;" |Votes cast / turnout
| style="text-align:right;" | 14,464,571
| style="text-align:right;" colspan=2|74.90%
|-
|colspan="4" style="text-align:right;" |Eligible voters
| style="text-align:right;" |19,311,105
| style="text-align:right;" colspan=2|
|}

Later political career
In May 2022, Chang was nominated by the Kuomintang as its candidate in the local elections for the Taoyuan mayoralty after a closed-door meeting of the party's Central Standing Committee.

See also
 List of vice premiers of the Republic of China

References

1954 births
Living people
Cornell University College of Engineering alumni
National Taiwan University alumni
Academic staff of the National Taiwan University
Anti-Japanese sentiment in Taiwan
Ministers of Science and Technology of the Republic of China
Premiers of the Republic of China on Taiwan
Mayors of Taoyuan City
Stanford University alumni